Pinnacle Bank Arena is a 15,500-seat indoor arena in the West Haymarket District of Lincoln, Nebraska. It was completed in 2013 and replaced the Bob Devaney Sports Center as the home of the University of Nebraska's men's and women's basketball teams.  A turn back tax to support a $25 million bond was approved by Lincoln voters on May 11, 2010.

On December 6, 2011, it was announced that Pinnacle Bank purchased the naming rights to the arena, at a cost of $11.25 million for 25 years. The first event at the new arena was NU's summer commencement ceremony on August 16, 2013, and the first concert was held a month later when Michael Bublé performed to a sold-out crowd on September 13. P!nk, Jason Aldean, Eagles, Elton John, Jay-Z, Trans-Siberian Orchestra, and Miranda Lambert also performed at PBA in the fall of 2013. Nebraska's basketball teams both played their first game in the arena on November 8, 2013. The women blew out No. 25 UCLA in the afternoon and the men defeated FGCU later that evening.

Additionally, the arena is the main venue for Nebraska's state high school basketball tournaments.

Features
36 founders and executive suites
20 loge boxes
832 club seats
73 concession points of sale
Two private club lounges
Husker Authentic Team store

Events and concerts

Events 
 Jeff Dunham – February 9, 2014; February 10, 2017
 Harlem Globetrotters – April 4, 2014; April 8, 2017; February 2, 2018
 Monster Jam – April 11–13, 2014; April 15–16, 2016; April 21–22, 2017; April 13–14, 2018; etc.
 Larry the Cable Guy – April 25, 2014
 Michael Jackson: The Immortal World Tour – June 24–25, 2014
 WWE SmackDown – September 2, 2014; April 23, 2019
 Disney Junior Live On Tour – October 12–13, 2014
 Disney on Ice presents Worlds of Fantasy – November 21–23, 2014
 Sesame Street Live – April 28–29, 2015
 Theresa Caputo Live! The Experience – October 17, 2015
 Chicago Bulls vs. Dallas Mavericks – October 23, 2015
 Sesame Street Live – April 26–27, 2016
 A Night of Hope with Joel Osteen – May 29, 2015
 NORCECA Olympic Qualification Tournament – January 7–9, 2016
 Ringling Bros. and Barnum & Bailey Circus – June 3–5, 2016
 Toruk – The First Flight – July 27–31, 2016
 Minnesota Timberwolves vs. Denver Nuggets – October 12, 2016
 Jeff Foxworthy & Larry the Cable Guy – March 31, 2017
 Daniel Tosh – April 14, 2017
 PRCA Championship Rodeo – April 28–29, 2017
 Terence Crawford vs. Julius Indongo – August 19, 2017
 PowerShares Series Tennis – October 6, 2017
 WWE Live – February 3, 2018
 Corteo by Cirque du Soleil – May 17–20, 2018
 UFC Fight Night: Gaethje vs. Vick- August 25, 2018
 Paw Patrol Live! "Race to the Rescue" – September 22–23, 2018
 Overcomer Tour with Dr. David Jeremiah – October 4, 2018
 Disney on Ice Presents Worlds of Enchantment – October 3–6, 2019

Concerts

Pictures

See also
Haymarket Park
Pershing Center
Lincoln station (Nebraska)
List of NCAA Division I basketball arenas

References

External links

Official Website
Construction homepage
Web Cam

Indoor arenas in Nebraska
College basketball venues in the United States
Basketball venues in Nebraska
Sports in Lincoln, Nebraska
Sports venues in Nebraska
Buildings and structures in Lincoln, Nebraska
Nebraska Cornhuskers basketball venues
Tourist attractions in Lincoln, Nebraska
2013 establishments in Nebraska